The Uganda Film Festival Award for Best Director, also known as Feature Film of the Year, is an award presented annually by Uganda Communications Commission (UCC) at the Uganda Film Festival Awards. It is given in honor of a film director who has exhibited outstanding directing while working in the film industry in Uganda. It's different from Best Feature Film which is awarded for best motion. The award was introduced in 2013 and the first winner of the award was Matt Bish for his directing work on State Research Bureau. Rehema Nanfuka became the first female director to be nominated at the Uganda Film Festival Awards in 2018 and became the first female director to win the award in Uganda.

Winners and nominees
The table below shows winners and nominees for Best Director since the inception of the award in 2013.

Multiple wins and nominations
The following individuals have won multiple Best Director awards:

The following directors have received two or more Best Director nominations

Superlatives

Female nominees/winners
Two female directors have been nominated in the category, and one has won the award.
 2018 Rehema Nanfuka for Veronica's Wish 
 2019  Eleanor Nabwiso for Bed of Thorns

References

Awards for best director
Ugandan film awards